The 1942 Kentucky Wildcats football team represented the University of Kentucky in the 1942 college football season. The season opened with a one-point loss to Georgia.

Schedule

References

Kentucky
Kentucky Wildcats football seasons
Kentucky Wildcats football